Eustachio Zanotti (27 November 1709 - 15 May 1782) was an Italian astronomer and engineer. He worked at the astronomical observatory in Bologna.

Biography 
Zanotti was born in Bologna where his father Giampietro was a poet, painter and art historian. His mother was Constanza M. Teresa Gambari. An uncle was the philosopher Francesco Maria Zanotti. Zanotti studied at Jesuit schools and became interest in science and mathematics, trained under Eustachio Manfredi (1674-1739) at the Bologna observatory where he began to work from 1729. He received a degree from the University of Bologna in 1730. In 1738 he examined Newton's theory of light. He became a director of the observatory in 1739 following Manfredi's death. His contributions included the improvement of instruments at the observatory, the calculation of the elliptical orbit of a comet, maintaining notes on transits of Mercury (May 6, 1752), Venus (June 6, 1761) with which he tried to estimate the distance between the sun and the earth as well as the diameter of Venus using parallax based measurements. He collated an ephemeris and star catalogue along with his assistants Petronio Matteucci and Giovanni Angelo Brunelli from 1751. He helped restore a sundial in 1776 that had been designed by Giovanni Cassini in the basilica of San Petronio. He also made predictions on the shape of the earth including the flattening of the poles based on Newtonian mechanics.  He made observations on the northern lights and took an interest in hydraulics. He was elected Fellow of the Royal Society of London in 1740 and was also a member of learned societies in Italy and Germany. His work on water flow measurements dealt with disputes relating to the flow of water in the Rhine and the Po. He was involved in reclamation of marshes and examining plans for canals. He wrote on the mathematics of perspective in art and sought to bridge the fields of mathematics and art.

References

Works

 
 
 
 
 
 

1709 births
1782 deaths
Italian astronomers
Fellows of the Royal Society